Russell Colcott (born 10 September 1949) is a former Australian rules footballer who played with Melbourne in the Victorian Football League (VFL).

Notes

External links 

1949 births
Living people
Australian rules footballers from Victoria (Australia)
Melbourne Football Club players